This article lists the results for the Thailand national football team between 1990 and 1999.

 Only record the results that affect the FIFA/Coca-Cola World Ranking. See FIFA 'A' matches criteria.

1990

1991

1992

1993

1994

1995

1996

1997

1998

1999

References

External links
 Football Association of Thailand 
 Thai Football.com
 Thai football page of Fifa.com
 Thai football Blog

1990s
1990s in Thai sport